VDW can refer to one of the following:

 Van der Waals:
 Johannes Diderik van der Waals, a Dutch physicist and thermodynamicist
 the van der Waals force
 the van der Waals equation
 the van der Waals radius
 Van der Waals (crater)
 Federation of German Scientists (Vereinigung Deutscher Wissenschaftler)
 Verbond tot Democratisering der Weermacht, a Dutch political party
 VDW (TV station), a digital television station in Western Australia